Therfield is both a small village of approximately 4,761 acres (19 km²) and a civil parish which sits upon the chalk range, three miles southwest of Royston, and six miles (10 km) northeast of Baldock and within the English county of Hertfordshire.

Brief history

Ancient history
The name Therfield is a variation of Tharfield and anciently Þurreweld. It is a theophoric placename referring to Thunor and means either 'Thunor's Field' or 'Thunor's High place", from the same Germanic root that gives 'veldt'. The village was inhabited long before the Anglo Saxons came: the Icknield Way runs through it, and Neolithic barrows have been found on Therfield Heath.

Today
Today Therfield is known as a very small village that is locally famous for its church, chapel and pub. The Nature Reserve of Therfield Heath lies a mile to the north of the village. From here on a clear day it is possible to see the Cathedral of Ely, over twenty miles to the north.

The Icknield Way Path passes through the village on its 110-mile journey from Ivinghoe Beacon in Buckinghamshire to Knettishall Heath in Suffolk.

Church of St. Mary the Virgin
In Therfield the Church of St Mary the Virgin has stood the test of time. The most recent building was completed in 1878 and it replaced the church that had existed since the 13th Century which fell into such disrepair that it was in danger of collapsing. When it was replaced, the windows, pulpit and font were removed from the old church and built into the new structure. The tower contains six bells dating from 1597, 1608, 1626, 1656, 1689 with the most recent from 1707. For years these bells were not used and worship services were marked by the ringing of a bell dated 1862 that hung from a tree in a nearby field. The church register dates from the year 1538.  Francis Turner (bishop) was buried here in the chancel in 1700. The church's original Stuart royal arms survives, and is unusual in that the inscription on the Garter is partly misspelt.

Therfield Chapel
Therfield Chapel was established as a congregation of Protestant dissenters (the "Independents") in 1836. The current Chapel was built subsequently, in 1854, and the Church eventually became known as Therfield Congregational Church, being affiliated to the Congregational Union who acted as trustees for the Church property. When in 1966 the Congregational Union was replaced by a body which espoused more liberal views, the Chapel seceded and became affiliated first to the Fellowship of Independent Evangelical Churches (FIEC), and then to the Evangelical Fellowship of Congregational Churches (EFCC).

In 1965, Allon Taffs was ordained as Pastor, after serving the church as Secretary/informal leader for some 10 years before. He remained until May 1993. After a period of interregnum, during which time the church was cared for and led by the elders and deacons, the Rev Mark Kingston was appointed as Pastor in August 1997. He served the church until he resigned in July 2002. Andrew Carter was appointed as Pastor in February 2006 until January 2016. In May 2016, Joshua Jones was appointed and currently serves as Pastor.

Governance
Therfield has three tiers of local government at parish, district and county level: Therfield Parish Council, North Hertfordshire District Council, and Hertfordshire County Council.

Therfield is an ancient parish, and it was part of the hundred of Odsey. Therfield was included in the Royston Poor Law Union from 1835. The Local Government Act 1894 created parish and district councils. Therfield Parish Council came into being on 13 December 1894, taking over the secular functions of the parish vestry, and the parish of Therfield was included in Ashwell Rural District from 28 December 1894. Despite the name, Ashwell Rural District Council was based in the town of Royston. Ashwell Rural District was abolished in 1935, becoming part of Hitchin Rural District, which in turn was abolished in 1974, becoming part of North Hertfordshire.

Castle 
Therfield contains the scheduled ruins of a motte and bailey castle. The fortification was most likely constructed in 1143-44 and was slighted before it was finished. It seems that it did or would have connected to a further embankment surrounding the original part of Therfield. The Castle is owned by Tuthill Farm and it was excavated in 1958 by a team led by Martin Biddle when the owner informed the Ministry of Works that he intended to bulldoze the site. The farmer was dissuaded from damaging the motte but most of the baily was levelled in 1960.

References

External links

History and pictures of Therfield.
 Hagg*r One Name Study Project
Hagger Genealogy Library

Villages in Hertfordshire
Civil parishes in Hertfordshire